American Beauty may refer to:

Arts and media

Books
 American Beauty (Ferber novel), a 1931 novel by Edna Ferber
 American Beauty (Dean novel), a 2006 novel by Zoey Dean in the A-List series

Film
 American Beauty (1999 film), a 1999 film starring Kevin Spacey and Annette Bening
 American Beauty (1927 film), a lost 1927 silent film romantic drama
 The American Beauty (1916 film), a lost silent film

Music

Albums
 American Beauty (album), a 1970 album by the Grateful Dead
 American Beauty: Original Motion Picture Score, the original score to the 1999 film
 American Beauty (soundtrack), a soundtrack to the 1999 film
 American Beauty (EP), a 2014 EP by Bruce Springsteen (or its title track)
 American Beauty/American Psycho, a 2015 album by Fall Out Boy (or its title track)
 American Beauty, 1998 album by The Nashville Bluegrass Band

Songs
"American Beauty", by Bruce Springsteen from American Beauty (EP), 2014
"American Beauty", by Pat Boone from Yes Indeed!, 1958
"American Beauty", by Fall Out Boy from American Beauty/American Psycho, 2015

Other uses
 Rosa 'American Beauty', a hybrid perpetual rose
 The chess game Levitsky versus Marshall

See also

"American Beauty Rose" (song), a 1961 single by Frank Sinatra
 American Beauty/American Psycho (album), 2015 album by Fall Out Boy
 American Beauty/American Psycho Tour (concert tour), a 2015 concert tour by Fall Out Boy
 "American Beauty/American Psycho" (song), a 2014 song by Fall Out Boy off the eponymous album American Beauty/American Psycho
 
 American (disambiguation)
 Beauty (disambiguation)